Orgyia leucostigma, the white-marked tussock moth, is a moth in the family Erebidae. The species was first described by James Edward Smith in 1797. The caterpillar is very common especially in late summer in eastern North America, extending as far west as Texas, California, and Alberta.

Etymology
The genus name Orgyia is from the ancient Greek word , órgyia - 'outstretched arms'. So named because, when at rest, the moth stretches forward its forelegs like arms.

Life cycle
Two or more generations occur per year in eastern North America. They overwinter in the egg stage.

Eggs
Eggs are laid in a single mass over the cocoon of the female, and covered in a froth. Up to 300 eggs are laid at a time.

Larvae

The larvae are brightly colored, with tufts of hair-like setae. The head is bright red and the body has yellow or white stripes, with a black stripe along the middle of the back. Bright red defensive glands are seen on the hind end of the back. Four white toothbrush-like tufts stand out from the back, and a gray-brown hair pencil is at the hind end. There’s a theory that the four white tufts mimic the external cocoons of parasitic wasps. Touching the hairs sets off an allergic reaction in many humans. Young larvae skeletonize the surface of the leaf, while older larvae eat everything except the larger veins. They grow to about 35 mm long.

Pupae
The caterpillars spin a grayish cocoon in bark crevices and incorporate setae in it. The moths emerge after two weeks.

Adults
The females have reduced wings and do not leave the vicinity of the cocoon. The males are gray with wavy black lines and a white spot on the forewings (the vapourer, Orgyia antiqua, is similar but is a rusty color.) The antennae are very feathery. Moths are found from June to October.

Host plants
The caterpillars may be found feeding on an extremely wide variety of trees, both deciduous and coniferous, including apple, birch, black locust, cherry, elm, fir, hackberry, hemlock, hickory, larch, oak, rose, spruce, chestnut, and  willow. Defoliating outbreaks are occasionally reported especially on Manitoba maple and elm in urban areas. Outbreaks are usually ended by viral disease.

Ecology
The fungus Entomophaga maimaiga was introduced to North America to control the gypsy moth (Lymantria dispar). The fungus also infects O. leucostigma and could possibly have an impact in years when E. maimaiga is abundant. Large larvae are mostly attacked by birds, and small larvae mostly disappear during dispersal.

Subspecies
O. l. leucostigma (South Carolina, from Georgia and Florida to Texas)
O. l. intermedia Fitch, 1856 (from Maine and Ontario to Virginia, Alberta and Kansas)
O. l. plagiata (Walker, 1855) (Nova Scotia, New Brunswick, Quebec)
O. l. oslari Barnes, 1900 (New Mexico, Colorado)
[[Orgyia leucostigma sablensis|O. l. sablensis]]'' Niel, 1979 (Sable Island, Canada)

Image Gallery

References

External links
 With images.

Lymantriinae
Moths of North America
Moths of Europe
Moths of Taiwan
Moths described in 1797